Strabomantis biporcatus (vernacular name: Puerto Cabello robber frog) is a species of frog in the family Strabomantidae. It is endemic to northern Venezuela and known from the Venezuelan Coastal Range and Serranía del Interior.
It is a terrestrial and nocturnal species. It is threatened by habitat loss and degradation caused by agriculture.

References

External links
 

biporcatus
Amphibians of Venezuela
Endemic fauna of Venezuela
Taxa named by Wilhelm Peters
Amphibians described in 1863
Taxonomy articles created by Polbot